Donington railway station was a station in the village of Donington on Bain, Lincolnshire, England.

History 

Passenger services ended on 5 November 1951, goods traffic on 1 December 1958.

Route

References

Disused railway stations in Lincolnshire
Former Great Northern Railway stations
Railway stations in Great Britain opened in 1876
Railway stations in Great Britain closed in 1951